Gilak may refer to:

 Gilaks, an Iranian ethnic group
 Gilak language, a member of the northwestern Iranian language branch

See also
 Gilyak (disambiguation)